Coll Island Airport  is located  west southwest of Arinagour on the island of Coll in the Inner Hebrides. Highland Airways who originally operated the route to Oban went into administration in 2010, but a new operator, Hebridean Air Services now operates the route under a PSO (Public service obligation) with flights to Oban and Tiree using Britten-Norman BN-2 Islander aircraft.

Airline and destinations

References

External links

Airports in Scotland
Coll